Park Apartments may refer to:

Park Apartments (Santa Rosa, California), listed on the National Register of Historic Places in Sonoma County, California
Park Apartments (Bridgeport, Connecticut), listed on the National Register of Historic Places in Fairfield County, Connecticut